Claire Bazy-Malaurie (born 14 April 1949) is a member of the Constitutional Council of France. Bazy-Malaurie is president of the Venice Commission since 10 December 2021.

References

External links
Page on the Conseil website

1949 births
Living people
Lawyers from Paris
Sciences Po alumni
École nationale d'administration alumni
Officiers of the Légion d'honneur
Officers of the Ordre national du Mérite